Cocoş Monastery is a monastery in Romania, located in a forest clearing 6 km south of the town Niculițel.

The monastery includes an abbot's house, a number of monks' dwellings, a bell tower, a chapel and a church dedicated to the Dormition of the Theotokos, all of which are on the list of historical monuments in Romania, being built between 1883 and 1913.

Gallery

References

Romanian Orthodox monasteries of Dobruja
Historic monuments in Tulcea County
Isaccea